Mendy is a surname. Notable people with the surname include:

Sports

Boxing 
Ambrose Mendy (born 1954), British boxing promoter 
Christophe Mendy (born 1971), French boxer 
Jean Baptiste Mendy (born 1963), French professional boxer 
Jean-Paul Mendy (born 1973), French boxer
Patrick Mendy (born 1990), Gambian professional boxer

Football 
Alexandre Mendy (born 1983), French footballer
Arnaud Mendy (born 1990), Bissau-Guinean footballer
Benjamin Mendy (born 1994), French footballer
Bernard Mendy (born 1981), French footballer
Christian Mendy (born 1984), French-Senegalese footballer 
Danlaba Mendy (born 1976), French footballer
Dominique Mendy (born 1983), Senegalese footballer
Édouard Mendy (born 1992), Senegalese footballer
Ferland Mendy (born 1995), French footballer
Frédéric Mendy (footballer, born 1973), French footballer
Frédéric Mendy (footballer, born 1981), Senegalese-French footballer
Frédéric Mendy (footballer, born 1988), French-born Bissau-Guinean footballer
Gaston Mendy (born 1985), Senegalese footballer
Jackson Mendy (born 1987), French-born Senegalese footballer
Jean-Paul Mendy (footballer) (born 1982), French footballer
Jean-Philippe Mendy (born 1987), French footballer
Jules Mendy (born 1994), Senegalese footballer
Léonard Mendy (born 1989), French footballer
Matthew Mendy (born 1983), Gambian footballer
Nampalys Mendy (born 1992), French footballer 
Pascal Mendy (born 1979), Senegalese footballer
Remond Mendy (born 1985), Senegalese footballer
Roger Mendy (born 1960), Senegalese footballer
Victor Mendy (born 1981), French-Senegalese footballer
Vincent Mendy (born 1988), French footballer

Other 
Claudine Mendy (born 1990), French handball player
Domingo Mendy (born 1870, date of death unknown), Uruguayan Olympic fencer
Ignacio Mendy (born 2000), Argentine rugby union player 
Pedro Mendy (born 1872, date of death unknown), Uruguayan Olympic fencer

See also
Mendy (disambiguation)
Mendy (given name)

Surnames of French origin
Surnames of African origin